Pedrinhas Paulista is a municipality in the state of São Paulo in Brazil. The population is 3,101 (2020 est.) in an area of 153 km². The elevation is 330 m.

References

Municipalities in São Paulo (state)